An herb grinder (or simply, a grinder) is a cylindrical device with two halves (top and bottom) that separate and have sharp teeth or pegs aligned in such a way that when both halves are turned, material inside is shredded.  Though the manufacturers claim they are intended for use with herbs and spices for cooking, they are often used to shred cannabis, and are often unsuitable for actual use with spices (which instead are prepared using a burr grinder), resulting in a product that can be more easily hand-rolled into a "joint" that burns more evenly.  Herb grinders are typically made of either metal or plastic and come in a variety of colors and polished metals.

Some grinders have two or three compartments instead of just one, with fine screens separating the bottom compartments from the ones above, thus allowing the marijuana trichomes, also called kief, to be collected separately.

The widespread adoption of cannabis as a recreational drug in recent times has caused herb grinders to become synonymous with weed grinders. There are many types of herb grinders out there, from electric to hand cranked, in various styles.  Advertisements describing them as "spice grinders" have sometimes confused buyers who were unaware about the actual intended use.

References

External links
 

Cannabis smoking
Drug paraphernalia
Food grinding tools